The 269th Infantry Division was a major fighting formation of the German Army (Wehrmacht).
It was created in August 1939, and first saw combat in the Battle of France, and was then posted to occupation duties in Denmark.
In the summer of 1941 the division advanced towards Leningrad in operation Barbarossa as part of Army Group North. Following the final drive on the city and the subsequent siege, the division  spent the winter and the next summer in defensive action along the Volkov river front, combating repeated Soviet attempts to restore land communications to Leningrad.

In December 1942 the division was transferred to Norway, where it remained for the next two years.
The division returned to action in November 1944, firstly in the west against the US forces and finally as a Battlegroup (Kampfgruppe) back in the east where the remains of the division finally surrendered to the Soviet forces in May 1945 at the end of the war.

Commanding officers
General der Artillerie Ernst-Eberhard Hell, 1. September 1939 – 12. August 1940
Generalleutnant Wolfgang Edler Herr und Freiherr von Plotho, 12. August 1940 – 31. March 1941
General der Infanterie	 Ernst von Leyser, 1 April 1941 – 31 August 1942
Generalleutnant Kurt Badinski, 1. September 1942 – 24 November 1943
Generalleutnant Hans Wagner 25. Nov. 1943 – 8 May 1945

References

Infantry divisions of Germany during World War II
Military units and formations established in 1938
Military units and formations disestablished in 1945